The 2021–22 Basketball Champions League Americas season was the 15h edition of the top-tier level professional club basketball competition in the Americas and the 3rd of the Basketball Champions League Americas (BCLA), since launched by FIBA in 2019. 

The season concluded with the Final Eight at the Carioca Arena 1 in Rio de Janeiro. São Paulo won its first continental title after defeating Biguá 98–84 in the championship game.

Team allocation
On 29 September 2021, FIBA announced the 12 teams from 7 countries to play in the 2021–22 BCLA season.

Teams
League positions after eventual playoffs of the previous season shown in parentheses. In Argentina, San Lorenzo was crowned champions but were rejected by FIBA due to outstanding debts to players.

The labels in the parentheses show how each team qualified for the place of its starting round:

 1st, 2nd, etc.: League position after Playoffs
 TH: Title holders
 SF: League semifinalist
 QF: League quarterfinalist
 CW: Preseason tournament winners
 WC: Qualified through Wild Card

Group phase
The draw for the regular season was held on 16 October 2021. The group phase began on 13 December 2021 and ended on 16 March 2022.

Group A

Group B

Group C

Group D

Final Eight
The Final Eight took place from 6 to 9 April 2022 at the Carioca Arena 1 in Rio de Janeiro, Brazil. The Ginásio do Maracanãzinho was originally chosen to host the Final Eight, but this was changed on 30 March 2022.

Bracket

Quarterfinals

Semifinals

Third place game

Final

Statistics
The following were the statistical leaders in the 2021–22 season.

Individual statistic leaders

Individual game highs

References

External links

2021–22
2021–22 in South American basketball
2021–22 in North American basketball